The 1988 Brantford municipal election was held on November 14, 1988, to elect a mayor, councillors, and school trustees in Brantford, Ontario, Canada. Elections were also held in the rural and small-town communities around the city.

Results

Kevin Davis has a Bachelor of Arts (Honours) degree from the University of Calgary and a Bachelor of Laws degree from Queen's University. He is a lawyer in Brantford and has chaired both the Brantford Regional Chamber of Commerce and the city's economic development board. Davis was first elected to Brantford City Council in 1985 and was returned without opposition in 1988; he did not seek re-election in 1991. He has also served on the board of Brantford's Progressive Conservative Party of Ontario association. Many expected that he would run for the party in the 2007 provincial election, but he declined.

References

1988 elections in Canada
1988
1988 in Ontario